Lakeside is an unincorporated area and census-designated place (CDP) in Flathead County, Montana, United States. The population was 2,669 at the 2010 census, up from 1,679 in 2000.

In 1892 the town was called Stoner, named after John J. Stoner, proprietor of a hotel near the shores of Flathead Lake. A community named Lakeside already existed in Roosevelt County. With its demise in 1920, this town changed its name.

West Shore State Park is 5 miles south of town.

Geography
Lakeside is located in southern Flathead County at  (48.019933, -114.228152), on the western shore of the north end of Flathead Lake. It is bordered to the north by Somers, and it extends south as far as the Lake County line. U.S. Route 93 passes through Lakeside, leading north  to Kalispell and south  to Polson at the south end of Flathead Lake.

Demographics

As of the census of 2000, there were 1,679 people, 705 households, and 520 families residing in the CDP. The population density was 228.9 people per square mile (88.3/km2). There were 956 housing units at an average density of 130.3 per square mile (50.3/km2). The racial makeup of the CDP was 97.92% White, 0.06% African American, 0.71% Native American, 0.42% Asian, 0.30% from other races, and 0.60% from two or more races. Hispanic or Latino of any race were 1.07% of the population. 15.6% were of English, 15.3% German, 14.8% Norwegian, 8.2% United States or American, 7.3% Irish and 5.5% Italian ancestry according to Census 2000.

There were 705 households, out of which 26.0% had children under the age of 18 living with them, 67.7% were married couples living together, 3.8% had a female householder with no husband present, and 26.2% were non-families. 22.7% of all households were made up of individuals, and 9.6% had someone living alone who was 65 years of age or older. The average household size was 2.38 and the average family size was 2.78.

In the CDP, the population was spread out, with 23.0% under the age of 18, 3.8% from 18 to 24, 24.2% from 25 to 44, 30.3% from 45 to 64, and 18.7% who were 65 years of age or older. The median age was 44 years. For every 100 females, there were 96.6 males. For every 100 females age 18 and over, there were 91.7 males.

The median income for a household in the CDP was $36,048, and the median income for a family was $43,839. Males had a median income of $30,819 versus $21,591 for females. The per capita income for the CDP was $18,533. About 13.6% of families and 17.3% of the population were below the poverty line, including 27.5% of those under age 18 and 9.6% of those age 65 or over.

References

Census-designated places in Flathead County, Montana
Census-designated places in Montana